I Told You So may refer to:

Songs
"I Told You So" (Randy Travis song), a 1988 single, covered by Carrie Underwood in 2007
"I Told You So" (Keith Urban song), a 2007 single
"I Told You So" (Ocean Colour Scene song), a 2007 single
"I Told You So" (Karmin song), a 2012 single
"I Told You So", by Aretha Franklin from her 1962 album The Electrifying Aretha Franklin

Albums
I Told You So (Count Basie album), a 1976 album
I Told You So (Chino XL album), a 2001 album
I Told You So: The Ultimate Hits of Randy Travis, a 2009 compilation album

Other
 I Told You So (film), a 1970 Ghanaian movie

See also
Told You So (disambiguation)